Denis Agustín Brizuela (born 12 May 1997) is an Argentine professional footballer who plays as an attacking midfielder for Deportivo Merlo.

Career
Brizuela's first career club was Deportivo Merlo, who he began featuring for at senior level during the 2015 Primera B Metropolitana campaign; he was selected in two fixtures, notably for his debut on 23 September versus Estudiantes. The club were relegated in 2015, with Brizuela subsequently playing twenty times across the following two campaigns in Primera C Metropolitana. In July 2017, Brizuela left Deportivo Merlo and joined Primera División side Banfield. Two years later, having only featured for their reserves, Brizuela departed and then signed with Villa Dálmine in Primera B Nacional. He appeared in eight matches across 2019–20.

Brizuela left Villa Dálmine in late 2020. On 1 February 2021, Brizuela completed a move abroad to Montenegro with First League outfit Jezero. He debuted in a home defeat to Zeta on 19 February, as he came off the bench to replace Vojin Pavlović with ten minutes left. Brizuela left Montenegro at the end of the 2021-22 season. In January 2022, he returned to his homeland and signed with his former club Deportivo Merlo.

Career statistics
.

References

External links

1997 births
Living people
People from La Matanza Partido
Argentine footballers
Association football midfielders
Argentine expatriate footballers
Expatriate footballers in Montenegro
Argentine expatriates in Montenegro
Primera B Metropolitana players
Primera C Metropolitana players
Primera Nacional players
Montenegrin First League players
Deportivo Merlo footballers
Club Atlético Banfield footballers
Villa Dálmine footballers
FK Jezero players
Sportspeople from Buenos Aires Province